Sayahnam is a 2000 Malayalam feature film that marks the directorial debut of R. Sarath with screenplay by himself. The film is a drama centred on the environmental and anti-nuclear issue in India. It stars O. Madhavan, Gomathi Mahadevan, Ebrahim Kutty and Alex Kadavil. It won seven Kerala State Film Awards and two National Film Awards.

Plot
An old man K.K. Madhavan noted for his thinking and stance on social issues is proud of his scientist son Siddharthan but upset about the country's involvement in nuclear tests.

He continues his crusade against nuclear weapons but together with his loyal wife Bharathi finds himself increasingly isolated as his own son, his party and the country celebrate the nuclear advances made in India.

Cast
 O. Madhavan
 Jomol
 Remya Nambeesan

Awards
 National Film Awards
 Indira Gandhi Award for Best Debut Film of a Director - R. Sarath (film director) and M. S. Nazeer (film producer)
 Kerala State Film Awards
 Best Film - Sayahnam
 Best Actor - O. Madhavan
 Best Story - R. Sarath
 Best Dubbing Artist - Gopalakrishnan
 Best Male Singer - Vidhu Prathap
 Best Editing - Beena Paul
 Best Art Direction - A. V. Gokuldas

References

External links
 Sayahnam at the British Film Institute Movie Database
 Sayahnam at the Malayalam Movie Database

2000s Malayalam-language films
Films scored by Perumbavoor G. Raveendranath
2000 directorial debut films
2000 films
Films directed by R. Sarath
Best Debut Feature Film of a Director National Film Award winners